The 2007–08 Nashville Predators season began October 4, 2007. It was their tenth season in the National Hockey League.

The 2007 off-season was dominated by the attempted purchase of the Predators by Canadian businessman Jim Balsillie, who signed a letter of intent to purchase the team for at least $220 million. The attempted sale led to widespread speculation that Balsillie intended to relocate the team to Hamilton, Ontario, if the Predators failed to reach a 14,000 paid average attendance in 2007–08, allowing the team to break its lease. Balsillie had already entered negotiations on a lease at Copps Coliseum in Hamilton. Despite calling the negotiations a "contingency plan," Balsillie petitioned the NHL to decide on his ability to relocate the franchise at the same time the NHL Board of Governors voted on his purchase of the team. However, the deal was ended by Predators Owner Craig Leipold on June 22, as he informed the NHL that he was pulling out of the agreement due to a lack of a finalized sale agreement and over concerns that Balsillie would relocate the team to Hamilton.

On August 1, a group led by local businessman David Freeman issued a letter of intent to purchase the Predators. The sale was approved by the Board of Governors on November 29.

In January, it was revealed that former Predators Owner Craig Leipold was purchasing the majority share in the Minnesota Wild.

Key dates prior to the start of the season:

The 2007 NHL Entry Draft took place in Columbus, Ohio, on June 22–23.
The free agency period began on July 1.

Regular season
On November 15, 2007, Martin Erat scored just 19 seconds into the overtime period to give the Predators a 5–4 home win over the Chicago Blackhawks. The Thrashers' Marian Hossa would tie that mark in overtime on December 23, 2007, in a 3–2 Atlanta road win over the St. Louis Blues. Both goals would prove to be the fastest overtime goals scored during the 2007–08 regular season.

Divisional standings

Conference standings

Game log

October
Record: 4–7–0; Home: 4–2–0; Road: 0–5–0

November
Record: 8–2–2; Home: 3–1–1; Road: 5–1–1

December
Record: 6–9–0; Home: 3–4–0; Away: 4–5–0

January
Record: 8–3–3; Home: 5–1–1; Road: 3–2–2

February
Record: 6–4–3 ; Home: 5–2–2 ; Road: 1–2–1

March
Record: 7-6-1; Home: 2-4-0; Road: 5-2-1

April
Record: 2-1-0; Home: 1-0-0; Road: 1-1-0

Playoffs

Western Conference Quarter-finals: Detroit Red Wings (1) vs. Nashville Predators (8) 
Red Wings win series 4–2.

Player stats

Skaters
Note: GP = Games played; G = Goals; A = Assists; Pts = Points; PIM = Penalty minutes

Goaltenders
Note: GP = Games played; TOI = Time on ice (minutes); W = Wins; L = Losses; OT = Overtime/shootout losses; GA = Goals against; SO = Shutouts; Sv% = Save percentage; GAA = Goals against average

Awards and records

Records
On March 30, goaltender Dan Ellis had a 233:39 long shutout streak snapped in a 1–0 overtime loss to the Detroit Red Wings. This was the fifth longest shutout streak in league history

Milestones

Transactions
The Predators were involved in the following transactions during the 2007–08 season.

Trades

Free agents

Draft picks
Nashville's picks at the 2007 NHL Entry Draft in Columbus, Ohio.  The Predators possess the 23rd overall pick in the draft.  The pick was originally traded to the Philadelphia Flyers when the Predators acquired Peter Forsberg.  Nashville re-acquired the pick, however, on June 18 in exchange for Scott Hartnell and Kimmo Timonen.

Farm teams

Milwaukee Admirals
The Milwaukee Admirals are the Predators' top affiliate, playing in the American Hockey League in 2007–08.

New Mexico Scorpions
The New Mexico Scorpions were a Predators' affiliate, playing in the Central Hockey League in 2007–08.  On July 2, 2009, the Scorpions ceased operations.

See also
2007–08 NHL season

References

Player stats: Nashville Predators player stats on espn.com
Game log: Nashville Predators game log on espn.com
Team standings: NHL standings on espn.com

Nash
Nash
Nashville Predators seasons